Philippe Bena (14 January 1952 – 4 December 2012) was a French fencer. He competed in the individual and team sabre events at the 1972 and 1976 Summer Olympics.

References

External links
 

1952 births
2012 deaths
French male sabre fencers
Olympic fencers of France
Fencers at the 1972 Summer Olympics
Fencers at the 1976 Summer Olympics